Mill Run is a tributary to Neshannock Creek in western Pennsylvania.  The stream rises in southeastern Mercer County and flows generally northwest entering Neshannock Creek near Milburn, Pennsylvania. Mill Run watershed is roughly 36% agricultural, 56% forested and the rest is other uses.

References

Rivers of Pennsylvania
Tributaries of the Beaver River
Rivers of Mercer County, Pennsylvania